Kakavand is a Kurdish tribe residing in Kermanshah Province, Lorestan Province in Iran and around Khanaqin in Iraq. In the second half of the 20th century they established themselves in the Pishkuh area of Lorestan, and also to the west of Qazvin and in Tarom. They speak Laki and adhere to Yarsanism.

References 

Kurdish tribes